The Grand Palace is a palace complex in Bangkok, Thailand. 

Grand Palace may also refer to:
 Grand Palace Hotel, Riga, Latvia
 Grand Palace at Peterhof Palace, Saint Petersburg, Russia
 Great Palace of Constantinople, Old Istanbul, Turkey 
 Grand Palace Hotel, New Orleans, U.S.

See also
 Grand Central Palace, New York City, U.S.
 Grand Ducal Palace, Luxembourg 
 Grand Kremlin Palace, Moscow, Russia 
 Grand Master's Palace (disambiguation)
 Grand Palais or Grand Palais des Champs-Élysées, Paris, France
 Grand Palais (Hanoi), an exhibition palace in Hanoi, French Indochina 
 List of palaces
 List of royal palaces
 Palace of the Grand Dukes of Lithuania, Vilnius